André Luiz de Oliveira Regatieri or simply André Luiz (born February 13, 1983),  is a Brazilian right back who plays for Marcílio Dias in the Campeonato Brasileiro Série D.

Contract
On July 14, 2010, André Luiz de Oliveira Regatieri signed a 2-year contract with the Iranian premier league giants, Esteghlal Tehran after passing the medical tests.
He will most probably play as Esteghlal's attacking right midfielder.
Other Brazilians playing at the moment for Esteghlal Tehran are :  Philipe Alvez (DF/MF) and Anderson Dos Santos (Striker)

Club Career Statistics

Last update:  3 May 2011 

 Assist Goals

Honours

Club
Iran's Premier Football League
Runner up: 1
2010/11 with Esteghlal

External links 
sambafoot
furacao
placar
CBF

1983 births
Living people
Brazilian footballers
Expatriate footballers in Iran
Esteghlal F.C. players
Club Athletico Paranaense players
Paraná Clube players
Sport Club Internacional players
Brasiliense Futebol Clube players
Association football defenders